Papua New Guinea is divided into four regions, which are its broadest administrative divisions of Papua New Guinea. While the 22 provincial-level divisions are the primary administrative divisions of PNG, the regions are quite significant in daily life, as they are often the basis for organisation of government services (such as police), corporate operations, sporting competitions, and even the machinations of politics.

Overview
For instance, there has been much discussion over the years of how many prime ministers have come from each region, and whether a particular region is due to provide the next one. Ministers and departmental heads are often appointed with an eye to maintaining an overall balance between the regions.

Regions
People generally identify quite strongly with their region, and inter-region rivalries can be intense. 

There are four regions, each of which comprises a number of provinces:

 Highlands Region: Chimbu (Simbu), Eastern Highlands, Enga, Hela, Jiwaka, Southern Highlands, and Western Highlands.
 Islands Region: Bougainville (North Solomons), East New Britain, Manus, New Ireland, and West New Britain.
 Momase Region: East Sepik, Madang, Morobe, and Sandaun (West Sepik).
 Southern Region: Central, Gulf, Milne Bay, Oro (Northern), and Western (Fly River).

Momase is a recently devised portmanteau word which combines the first two letters of Morobe, Madang, and Sepik.

See also
 Provinces of Papua New Guinea
 Districts of Papua New Guinea
 Local-level governments of Papua New Guinea
 List of cities and towns in Papua New Guinea
 List of cities and towns in Papua New Guinea by population

 
Subdivisions of Papua New Guinea
Papua New Guinea, Regions
Papua New Guinea 0
Regions